Ian Carnegie Mort (4 April 1937 – 19 January 1996) was an Australian rules footballer who played for Hawthorn in the VFL during the early 1960s.

The son of former Hawthorn player Harry Mort and Verna Frances Hinde, Mort played as a half forward flanker and was a member of Hawthorn's 1961 premiership team.

Notes

External links

1937 births
Australian rules footballers from Melbourne
Hawthorn Football Club players
Hawthorn Football Club Premiership players
Kew Football Club players
1996 deaths
One-time VFL/AFL Premiership players
People from Kew, Victoria